Park Road 72 (PR 72) is a park road in Fort Bend County, Texas that begins at Farm to Market Road 762 (FM 762) and goes east into Brazos Bend State Park.

Route description
PR 72 starts at FM 762 at the entrance of Brazos Bend State Park and goes east, entering the park. After  the road comes to the ranger station where the park user fee is collected. For  PR 72 loops around the south end of a point of timber before it steadies on a straight easterly heading for  through the woods. Near Creekfield Lake, a park drive branches off going north to some campgrounds.

History

PR 72 was originally designated on August 21, 1978 in Hale Ranch State Park in Fort Bend County.

The park's original name of Hale Ranch came from a hunting preserve belonging to Herman Hale, Joe Wesendoff and the Pilant Club of Houston. Hale Ranch is now part of Brazos Bend State Park. The park is located where Big Creek empties into the Brazos River.

Major intersections

See also

References

External links

0072
Transportation in Fort Bend County, Texas